The Grammy Award for Best Instrumental Soloist(s) Performance (with orchestra) was awarded from 1959 to 2011. From 1967 to 1971, and in 1987, the award was combined with the award for Best Instrumental Soloist Performance (without orchestra) and awarded as the Grammy Award for Best Classical Performance – Instrumental Soloist or Soloists (with or without orchestra). 

The award has had several minor name changes:
 In 1959 the award was known as Best Classical Performance – Instrumentalist (with concerto scale accompaniment)
 In 1960 it was awarded as Best Classical Performance – Concerto or Instrumental Soloist (with full orchestral accompaniment)
 In 1961 it was awarded as Best Classical Performance – Concerto or Instrumental Soloist
 In 1962 it was awarded as Best Classical Performance – Instrumental Soloist (with orchestra)
 From 1963 to 1964 it was awarded as Best Classical Performance – Instrumental Soloist or Soloists (with orchestra)
 In 1965 it was awarded as Best Performance – Instrumental Soloist or Soloists (with orchestra)
 From 1966 to 1991 and in 1994 it was awarded as Best Classical Performance – Instrumental Soloist or Soloists (with orchestra) (or a very similar equivalent)
 In 1992 it was awarded as Best Instrumental Soloist With Orchestra 
 In 1993 it was awarded as Best Classical Performance – Instrumental Solo With Orchestra
 From 1995 to 2011 it was awarded as Best Instrumental Soloist(s) Performance (with orchestra) 

In 2012, the award was discontinued in a major overhaul of Grammy categories. The category was merged with the Best Instrumental Soloist Performance (without orchestra) category to form the new Best Classical Instrumental Solo category, similar to the award from 1967 to 1971.

Years reflect the year in which the Grammy Awards were presented, for works released in the previous year.

Winners & Nominees

1950s

1960s

1970s

1980s

1990s

2000s

2010s

References

Grammy Awards for classical music